XYZ were a short-lived English rock supergroup. The name XYZ is taken from eX-Yes-Zeppelin as the group consisted of ex-Led Zeppelin guitarist Jimmy Page, along with ex-Yes members Chris Squire (bass guitar, vocals, keyboards) and Alan White (drums).

History 
The band came together after Squire met Page by chance at a party shortly before Christmas 1980. The group also featured former Greenslade keyboard player and vocalist Dave Lawson.  Squire was the main writer for the group. Page believed the band needed a strong vocalist and sought out former Led Zeppelin frontman Robert Plant. Plant did attend one XYZ rehearsal on 28 February 1981, but decided not to join the group citing his dislike for the complexity of the music, and because he was still deeply hurt by the recent death of Led Zeppelin's drummer and his long-time friend, John Bonham.

Without a firm commitment from Plant and contractual issues on who should manage the group (Peter Grant or Brian Lane), the project was shelved shortly thereafter.

With XYZ's future in limbo, Squire and White recorded a Christmas single called "Run with the Fox", in October 1981 at Squire's house, New Pipers, before forming Cinema, with guitarist Trevor Rabin and keyboardist Tony Kaye. Rabin initially attempted to rework the XYZ material along with his solo songs for the new group. Cinema went on to become a reformation of Yes with the addition of singer Jon Anderson, and the recording of the album 90125 in 1983. It is unclear what of the XYZ material made it to 90125, but White said in a 2008 interview that "those were the beginning of some songs that ended up on the next Yes album anyway." White also confirmed the XYZ material was used on 90125 album in a 2012 interview.

In 1984, Jimmy Page joined Yes, including Squire and White, on stage, playing "I'm Down" during a concert in their 9012Live tour at Westfalenhalle in Dortmund, Germany.

Page has not dismissed the possibility of releasing the XYZ material. Squire supported the idea, but said Page hadn't discussed the matter with him. Chris Squire died in 2015 and very little has been heard about releasing material, except some speculation in 2020. Alan White also died in 2022, leaving only Page and Lawson as surviving members.

Demoed material 
A four-song demo tape of XYZ consisting of two instrumentals and two songs, "Can You See" and "Telephone Secrets" (featuring vocals from Squire), exists and can be found on ROIO trading sites.

Instrumental: part of one instrumental was reworked and became part of "Mind Drive" on the 1997 Yes album Keys to Ascension 2 (credited as a band composition).
Instrumental: part of the other instrumental was used as the intro to The Firm's "Fortune Hunter". About "Fortune Hunter", Squire explained, "One of the tracks ended up being called "Fortune Hunter" [...] that was a riff that Jimmy brought into the mix anyway. Part of our song "Mind Drive" was also from those sessions as well. [...] Most of the songs were mine. I'm the only vocalist on it."
"Can You See" would resurface as "Can You Imagine" on the Yes' 2001 album Magnification.

Personnel
 Chris Squire – bass guitar, vocals
 Jimmy Page – lead guitar
 Dave Lawson – keyboards
 Alan White – drums

References

External links
Davelawson.org

English progressive rock groups
British supergroups
Musical groups established in 1981
Musical groups disestablished in 1981
1981 establishments in England
1981 disestablishments in England
Rock music supergroups
Jimmy Page
Yes (band)